Heterogynis penella is a moth in the Heterogynidae family. It is found in the Mediterranean region and the southern Alps. In central Europe, it is known from the Alsace.

The wingspan is 24–27 mm. Adults are on wing in June in one generation per year.

The larvae are known to feed on Genista pilosa, but have also been reared on Lotus corniculatus.

Life history
Males reach about half the size of females. The male larvae start early spinning a white cocoon. The pupa is made within and is black. The female pupa is yellow with grey stripes at the front and bright brown at the end. Males emerge in about two weeks, at the same time as the females who only need five days to develop.

External links
 lepiforum.de
 Moths and Butterflies of Europe and North Africa
 Fauna Europaea

Heterogynidae
Moths of Europe